John Wales (July 31, 1783 – December 3, 1863) was an American lawyer and politician from Wilmington, in New Castle County, Delaware. He was a member of the Whig Party who served as U.S. Senator from Delaware.

Early life and family
Wales was born in New Haven, Connecticut, and graduated from Yale College in 1801. He was admitted to the Connecticut Bar in 1801 and began practicing law in New Haven, and later, Philadelphia, Pennsylvania. After two years in Baltimore, Maryland, he moved to Wilmington, Delaware, in 1815.

Professional career
In 1814, Wales became a secretary for the Society for the Promotion of American Manufacturers, which was designed to promote and encourage Delaware's manufacturing industry. Wales drafted the by-laws of the Savings Bank in 1832, then served as the president of the Bank of Wilmington and Brandywine from 1824 to 1829.

Political career
Wales served as the Secretary of State for Delaware from 1845 to 1849, and was elected as a Whig to the U.S. Senate to fill the vacancy left when John M. Clayton resigned. Taking office on February 23, 1849, he served until March 3, 1851, having failed in his reelection bid.

An abolitionist, Wales served as a Delaware representative to the First National Convention of the Abolition of Slavery along with famous abolitionist Thomas Garrett.  When Garrett was tried in 1848 for aiding the escape of a slave family, Wales served as his lawyer. He was also one of the founders of Newark College in Newark, Delaware, now the University of Delaware.

Death and legacy
Wales died in Wilmington and is buried in the Wilmington and Brandywine Cemetery.

Almanac
The General Assembly chose the U.S. Senators, who took office March 4, for a six-year term. In this case he was completing the existing term, the vacancy caused by the resignation of John M. Clayton.

References
Biographical Dictionary of the United States Congress
Delaware’s Members of Congress
Find a Grave
The Political Graveyard 
The Underground Railroad

Places with more information
Delaware Historical Society; website; 505 North Market Street, Wilmington, Delaware 19801; (302) 655-7161
University of Delaware; Library website; 181 South College Avenue, Newark, Delaware 19717; (302) 831-2965

1783 births
1863 deaths
Burials at Wilmington and Brandywine Cemetery
People from Wilmington, Delaware
Yale College alumni
Delaware lawyers
Delaware Whigs
19th-century American politicians
Secretaries of State of Delaware
United States senators from Delaware
Whig Party United States senators
American abolitionists
19th-century American lawyers